The 2020 European Tour was the 49th season of golf tournaments since the European Tour officially began in 1972 and the 12th edition of the Race to Dubai.

The COVID-19 pandemic had a major impact on the season, with many tournaments being rescheduled or cancelled. All four major championships were affected; The Open Championship was cancelled, and the Masters Tournament, U.S. Open and PGA Championship were moved to dates much later in the year.

After a three-month hiatus following the Qatar Masters in early March, the tour resumed with a much changed schedule in July. Two dual-ranking events in Austria were followed by six-tournament stretch in the United Kingdom and three tournaments in Spain and Portugal, with the rescheduled major events starting in late September.

On 13 August, it was announced that Alexander Lévy had become the first European Tour player to return a positive test for COVID-19. He and Romain Wattel, who had been in close contact with Lévy, were withdrawn from the field for the Celtic Classic.

The Race to Dubai was won by Lee Westwood for the third time. He was also named Golfer of the Year for the fourth time, with Sami Välimäki named Rookie of the Year.

Planned changes for 2020

Rule changes
In order to combat slow play, from the Abu Dhabi HSBC Championship onwards, regulations were introduced whereby a player would receive a one-stroke penalty for two bad times during a tournament.

Scheduling changes
With the addition of golf at the Olympic Games to the schedule in 2020, the Irish Open was moved to May from its previous date in July in order to avoid a clash with the WGC-FedEx St. Jude Invitational, which had already been moved to avoid the Olympics. The Open de France was then scheduled opposite the WGC Invitational, and the British Masters was scheduled opposite the Olympics.

In-season changes
Due to the 2019–20 Hong Kong protests, the Honma Hong Kong Open, originally scheduled for 28 November – 1 December 2019 as a co-sanctioned event with the Asian Tour, was rescheduled for 9–12 January 2020 as an Asian Tour event without European Tour sanctioning.

The remainder of the schedule was severely impacted by the COVID-19 pandemic.
On 14 February, the Maybank Championship in Malaysia and the Volvo China Open were postponed. Sponsors subsequently confirmed that the Maybank Championship had been cancelled.
On 6 March, the Magical Kenya Open was postponed.
On 11 March, the Hero Indian Open was postponed, and the D+D Real Czech Masters was cancelled.
On 13 March, the WGC-Dell Technologies Match Play was cancelled.
On 17 March, the Estrella Damm N.A. Andalucía Masters was postponed.
On 19 March, the GolfSixes Cascais was cancelled and the Made in Denmark was postponed. Organisers subsequently confirmed that the Made in Denmark had been cancelled.
On 30 March, the Dubai Duty Free Irish Open was postponed.
On 6 April, the Trophée Hassan II was postponed and the inaugural Scandinavian Mixed was cancelled. The R&A also announced the cancellation of the Open Championship in 2020, and the seasons other major championships were rescheduled.
On 16 April, the PGA Tour announced the rescheduling of several tournaments, including the WGC-FedEx St. Jude Invitational.
On 17 April, the BMW International Open and Open de France were cancelled, and the Aberdeen Standard Investments Scottish Open was postponed.
On 1 May, the Omega European Masters was cancelled.
On 28 May, the European Tour announced a revamp to the 2020 schedule including a 6-week "UK swing" in July and August, starting with the Betfred British Masters which was brought forward a week, finishing on 25 July. That would be followed by revivals of the English Open and the Wales Open, and three new tournaments: the English Championship, the Celtic Classic, and the UK Championship. In addition to this, four Rolex Series events were given rescheduled dates, with the Aberdeen Standard Investments Scottish Open and the BMW PGA Championship being pushed into October, and the Nedbank Golf Challenge and the season-ending DP World Tour Championship, Dubai being played in December. It was also announced that the Porsche European Open had been cancelled.
On 15 June, it was announced that both the European Tour and the Challenge Tour would return on 9 July with two consecutive dual-ranking events in Austria: the Austrian Open and the Euram Bank Open.
On 3 July, it was announced that the Hero Indian Open had been cancelled.
On 7 July, organisers announced the cancellation of the KLM Open.
On 8 July, new dates were announced for the postponed Andalucía Masters; the Portugal Masters was also rescheduled, with both tournaments being held during September. Later in the day, it was announced that the 43rd Ryder Cup matches had been postponed until 2021.
On 10 July, new dates in November were announced for the Kenya Open, originally scheduled for March. The Challenge Tour's Open de Portugal was also added to the schedule as a dual-ranking event; held in September following the Portugal Masters, the addition created a three event "Iberian Swing" starting with the Andalucía Masters.
On 13 July, the cancellation of the Mutuactivos Open de España was announced after suitable dates could not be found in the revised schedule.
On 27 July, the cancellation of the Alfred Dunhill Links Championship was announced, with organisers citing complexities of accommodating the European Tour's COVID-19 safety plan given the event's scale as an international pro-am and its traditional use of three separate venues.
On 14 August, the Irish Open was rescheduled to 24–27 September with a change of venue to Galgorm Castle in Northern Ireland and a reduced prize fund, which also meant the loss of its status as a Rolex Series event.
On 17 August, it was announced that the previously rescheduled Scottish Open and the BMW PGA Championship had both been forward one week, such that they directly follow the Irish Open and create a second "UK swing".
On 28 August, two Rolex Series events, the Turkish Airlines Open and the Nedbank Golf Challenge, were cancelled and a third, the Italian Open, was rescheduled and downgraded. Three new tournaments were also announced, to take place in mid to late October and early November: the Scottish Championship, extending the second UK Swing to four tournaments, and the Cyprus Open and the Cyprus Classic, the first tour events to be held in Cyprus. On 12 October, the Cyprus Classic was renamed as the Cyprus Showdown with a novel elimination-style format.
On 1 September, the cancellation of the 2020 edition of the WGC-HSBC Champions due to the COVID-19 pandemic was announced.
On 10 September, the Kenya Open was cancelled; it had previously been postponed in March and rescheduled to November.
On 16 September, it was announced that the Australian PGA Championship had been postponed, with the tournament provisionally rescheduled for February 2021. As such, it no longer forms part of the 2020 season schedule. On 16 October, it was announced that it had been cancelled.
On 20 October, it was announced that the Joburg Open had been added to the calendar; scheduled for the week following the Masters Tournament, it was last held in 2017.
On 21 October, the Alfred Dunhill Championship was added to the schedule, creating a "South African Swing"; it was the second edition of the tournament during the 2020 season, the first having been held in November/December 2019.
On 22 October, the three-week "South African Swing" was completed with the addition of the South African Open to the schedule; it was the second edition of the tournament during the 2020 season, the first having been held in January.
On 9 November, a final adjustment to the schedule was made. The Golf in Dubai Championship was added as the penultimate event of the 2020 schedule, preceding the season ending DP World Tour Championship, Dubai.

Tournament changes
Format change: the Scandinavian Invitation (formerly the Scandinavian Masters) became the Scandinavian Mixed, a co-sanctioned event with the Ladies European Tour consisting of a field of 78 men and 78 women.
No longer part of the schedule: ISPS Handa World Super 6 Perth, Belgian Knockout

Schedule
The following table lists official events during the 2020 season.

Unofficial events
The following events were sanctioned by the European Tour, but did not carry official money, nor were wins official.

Location of tournaments
The tournament locations below represent the original schedule, before any changes due to COVID-19 pandemic.

Race to Dubai
Final top 10 players in the Race to Dubai:

• Did not play

UK Swing Order of Merit
With the return of the European Tour after the COVID-19 hiatus and as part of the new Golf for Good initiative – which underpinned all events for the remainder of the 2020 season – a mini Order of Merit ran for all six events in the "UK Swing", with the top ten players sharing an additional £250,000 to donate to charities of their choice. The top ten, not otherwise exempt, from the standings of the UK Swing Order of Merit after the first five events received entry into the 2020 U.S. Open. 

Final top 10 players in the UK Swing Order of Merit standings:

• Did not play

U.S. Open qualifiers
The leading players in the points standings following the ISPS Handa Wales Open, who qualified for 2020 U.S. Open, were as follows:

Thomas Detry
Justin Harding
Rasmus Højgaard
Sam Horsfield
Romain Langasque
Adrián Otaegui
Renato Paratore
Andy Sullivan
Connor Syme
Sami Välimäki

Awards

See also
2019 in golf
2020 in golf
2020 Challenge Tour
2020 European Senior Tour
2020 Ladies European Tour
2019–20 PGA Tour
2020–21 PGA Tour

Notes

References

External links
Official site

2020
2019 in golf
2020 in golf
European Tour